John Anthony Angelicoussis (16 November 1948 – 10 April 2021) was a Greek billionaire, owner of the Angelicoussis Shipping Group.

Early life
John Anthony Angelicoussis was born in November 1948, the son of Anthony J. Angelicoussis (1918–1989) and Maria Papalios. He bought his first ship in 1953. In 1968, with his partner Dimitris Efthymiou, he established the Agelef Shipping Company, and then joined his father's company in 1973.

Career
In 1987, Anangel-American Shipholdings was floated on the Luxembourg stock market. Two years later the company listed on Nasdaq, where it remained until it was delisted in 2001.

John Angelicoussis managed Angelicoussis Shipping Group, which owned Anangel Maritime Services, Maran Tankers Management and Maran Gas Maritime. In 2002, he reached an agreement with his sister to break the 50/50 control deal and take over the group.

Fortune 
In March 2015, Angelicoussis had a net worth of $2.4 billion, and a fleet of 96 ships, according to Bloomberg.

 Apart from having the largest Greek-owned fleet, Angelicoussis controls the largest Greek-flag fleet, with only one bulk carrier under non-Greek colors and seven tankers, which are on bareboat charters.

In 2019, he was still the largest shipowner in Greece in terms of tonnage. In July 2018, he had ordered his 100th ship, and strengthened his investments in LNG ships, his company being the number 1 shipper of LNG to the US in 2019 and the first Greek company to own LNG carriers.

Awards 
 2005: 5th in the Lloyd's List Top 100 Most Influential People in the Shipping Industry.
 2004: 4th in the Lloyd's List Top 100 Most Influential People in the Shipping Industry.

Personal life
He was married to Elizabeth Angelicoussis. Their only daughter, Maria Angelicoussis (Mrs Lawrence Frankopan), has trained as a doctor and works for the Angelicoussis Group since 2009. She is involved in all major investment decisions taken and in the daily operations of all three management companies.

References

1948 births
2021 deaths
Greek billionaires
Greek businesspeople in shipping